Trevorrow is a Cornish surname originating in the Cornish language and may refer to:

 Colin Trevorrow (born 1976), American director and screenwriter
 Ellen Trevorrow, Ngarrindjeri weaver at Camp Coorong, South Australia
Tom Trevorrow, Ellen's husband, now deceased, who co-founded Camp Coorong with his brother George
 Georgina Trevorrow, Australian musician
 John Trevorrow (born 1949), Australian cyclist
 Mark Trevorrow (born 1959), Australian comedian and television host

See also

 Eric Treverrow
 Trevorrow, a place in the parish of Ludgvan in Cornwall
 
 Trevor (disambiguation)
 Trefor (disambiguation)
 Trev

Cornish-language surnames